Harvey Anderson García Ibarras (born March 16, 1984 in Caracas, Venezuela) is a former Major League Baseball pitcher.

Professional career

Florida Marlins
Garcia was signed as an amateur free agent by the Florida Marlins in 2000 and after pitching for their Dominican League team he was released in 2002 and signed with the Boston Red Sox.

Boston Red Sox
Garcia signed with the Boston Red Sox on June 14, 2002. In November 2005, he was traded by the Red Sox to the Marlins along with Hanley Ramírez, Aníbal Sánchez and Jesús Delgado in exchange for Josh Beckett, Mike Lowell and Guillermo Mota.

Return to the Marlins
In November 2005, he was traded by the Red Sox to the Marlins along with Hanley Ramírez, Aníbal Sánchez and Jesús Delgado in exchange for Josh Beckett, Mike Lowell and Guillermo Mota. He was called up on September 2,  and made his major league debut on September 3, 2007 against the Washington Nationals. He pitched in eight games with the Marlins in September, finishing 0–1 with a 4.38 ERA. He did not pitch in 2008 because of injury and during Spring Training in 2009 he was released by the Marlins.

Pittsburgh Pirates
On June 23, 2009 Garcia signed a minor league contract with the Pittsburgh Pirates. He appeared in 10 games with the Pirates Class-A team, the Lynchburg Hillcats and then was traded to the Los Angeles Dodgers to complete the trade that sent Delwyn Young to the Pirates for Eric Krebs and Garcia.

Los Angeles Dodgers
Garcia was traded to the Los Angeles Dodgers to complete the trade that sent Delwyn Young to the Pittsburgh Pirates for Eric Krebs and Garcia. He began 2010 with the Chattanooga Lookouts in the Double-A Southern League but was released by the Dodgers on May 22, 2010.

Washington Nationals
He signed with the Washington Nationals in December 2010, but he was released before the 2011 season.

France
In 2016, García began playing in the French Division 1 Baseball Championship. He spent the 2016 season in Toulouse with the Tigers de Toulouse. In 2017, he played in Saint-Just-Saint-Rambert for Saint-Just-Saint-Rambert Duffy Duck's. In 2019 and 2020, he played in Paris with the Paris Université Club.

See also
 List of Major League Baseball players from Venezuela

References

External links

Pura Pelota – VPBL statistics

1984 births
Living people
Albuquerque Isotopes players
Cardenales de Lara players
Carolina Mudcats players
Chattanooga Lookouts players
Dominican Summer League Red Sox players
Florida Marlins players
Greenville Bombers players
Gulf Coast Pirates players
Gulf Coast Red Sox players
Jupiter Hammerheads players
Leones del Caracas players
Lowell Spinners players
Lynchburg Hillcats players
Major League Baseball pitchers
Major League Baseball players from Venezuela
Baseball players from Caracas
Tigres de Aragua players
Venezuelan expatriate baseball players in the United States
Venezuelan expatriate sportspeople in France